Wang Heun may refer to:

Myeongjong of Goryeo (1131–1202), born Wang Heun, king of Goryeo
Chungmok of Goryeo (1337–1348), personal name Wang Heun, king of Goryeo